The Michigan Wolverines women's basketball program is a college basketball team that represents the University of Michigan in the Big Ten Conference of the National Collegiate Athletic Association (NCAA). The team has had nine head coaches in its history. The current head coach is Kim Barnes Arico who was hired in 2012.

Kim Barnes Arico is the all-time leader in games coached (360), wins (241), and winning percentage. Kim Barnes Arico is the first and only head coach to have led the team to a postseason championship.

List of coaches

References

Michigan

Michigan Wolverines basketball coaches